Bumfights is a video series produced by Indecline Films. The debut release titled Bumfights Vol. 1: A Cause for Concern features primarily high school fights caught on tape and homeless men (most notably Rufus Hannah and Donnie Brennan) in the San Diego, San Francisco, Los Angeles, and Las Vegas metropolitan areas attempting amateur stunts in a style inspired by the popular MTV series Jackass. It was produced by Ryen McPherson, with friends Zachary Bubeck, Kevin Zinter, Daniel J. Tanner, and Michael Slyman, as Indecline Films. Contrary to its title, the video does not depict homeless men actually fighting, but instead a compilation of street fights caught on tape and homeless men performing in skits and stunts.

The video series immediately garnered criticism. In April 2006, the four original filmmakers agreed not to produce any more Bumfights videos or distribute videos already made, and to pay three homeless men depicted in the videos, under a settlement announced shortly before a lawsuit was due to go to trial.

Reception
By June 2002, 250,000 copies of the first volume of the series were reported sold for $22 each, according to Wired magazine. Community complaints led to the police investigating if any laws were broken by producers. Advocacy groups were critical of the video.

Production history 
The videos were originally produced in the early 2000s. The notorious videos had gained such popularity, that by 2002, there were large volumes of sales and merchandise. Around that time, the four original founders sold the business to two Las Vegas businessmen, who went by the pseudonyms Ty Beeson and Ray Leticia for $1.5 million USD. Beeson and Leticia released the three follow videos, volumes 2 - 4, including footage that was provided as part of their purchase of the business.

Indecline: Vol. 1—"It's Worse Than You Think"
Ryen McPherson moved on to produce a similar reality video called Indecline: Vol. 1—It's Worse Than You Think. Though controversial for its fight footage and acts of elaborate graffiti art, legal troubles did not hinder the sales of this video, although the website went offline in June 2008. The Indecline web site went back online in November 2008.

Bumfights videos
 Bumfights Vol. 1: A Cause for Concern (2002)
 Bumfights Vol. 2: Bumlife (2003)
 Bumfights Vol. 3: The Felony Footage (2004)
 Bumfights Vol. 4: Return of Ruckus (2006)

Appearance on Dr. Phil 
Phil McGraw, host of the talk show Dr. Phil invited one of the creators of Bumfights, Ty Beeson, on to the show on December 12, 2006. Beeson attended the interview dressed in a Dr. Phil costume, nearly identical to Dr. Phil himself. After playing some snippets from the Bumfights videos to the audience, Dr. Phil stated that he was disgusted and kicked the Bumfights representative off even before the interview started, with security removing Beeson from the stage. While briefly onstage, Beeson critiqued what he perceived as Dr. Phil's hypocrisy; being outraged over their exploitation of the poor while he himself exploited people in duress for entertainment on his show. Dr. Phil revealed in the next segment he himself had been homeless. McPherson and Slyman later claimed that the man who appeared on the show was not Beeson, but in fact someone impersonating him, organized by the real Beeson and Leticia.

References

External links

Film series introduced in 2002
American film series
American exploitation films
Homelessness in popular culture
Film controversies in Canada
Obscenity controversies in film